Monsieur Camembert is a five-piece Gypsy fusion band formed in Sydney, Australia in 1997. They have won three ARIA Music Awards for Best World Music Album in 2002 for Live on Stage (released in 2001), in 2003 for Absynthe and in 2005 for Monsieur Camembert. The linguistic repertoire of Monsieur Camembert's music includes English, Russian, Hebrew and Yiddish.

History

Monsieur Camembert formed as a five-piece Gypsy fusion band in Sydney, Australia in 1997. Their first album, was the live release The Gypsy Hot Club Presents Monsieur Camembert, which featured Svetlana Bunic on accordion, Julian Curwin on lead guitar, Yaron Hallis on vocals and rhythm guitar, Michael Lira on double bass and Daniel Weltlinger on violin and was recorded at The Gypsy Hot Club. Released in 1999, it is also titled, Live @ The Basement and demonstrated their styles including Gypsy swing, Greek, Hungarian-Russian gypsy, klezmer, tango and original songs.

Their second album was also a live performance, Live on Stage which was released on 11 September 2001. Performing on the album were Mark Atkins on didgeridoo, Eddie Bronson on percussion, Bunic, Curwin, Shenton Gregory on violin, Hallis and Mark Szeto on bass.

They have won three ARIA Music Awards for Best World Music Album (2002, 2003, 2005). The linguistic repertoire of Monsieur Camembert's music includes English, Russian, Romani, Hebrew and Yiddish.

Band members
As of 2009:
 Yaron Hallis (Lead Vocals/Rhythm Guitar)
 Matt Ottignon/Edouard Bronson (Saxes/Clarinet/Flute)
 Marcello Maio (Accordion/Piano)
 Julian Curwin (Lead Guitar)
 Mark Harris (Double Bass/Vocals)

Guest artists including: 
 Shenzo Gregorio (Violin)
 Vladimir Khusid (Trumpet/Flugelhorn)
 Anatoli Torjinski (5 String Cello/Balalaika)
 Daniel Weltlinger (Violin)
 Svetlana Bunic (Accordion)
 Jim Pennell (Lead Guitar)
 Stuart Vandegraaf (Saxes/Clarinet/Flute)

Discography

Albums

Awards and nominations

ARIA Music Awards
The ARIA Music Awards is an annual awards ceremony that recognises excellence, innovation, and achievement across all genres of Australian music. They commenced in 1987.

! 
|-
| 2002
| Live on Stage
| ARIA Award for Best World Music Album
| 
|rowspan="3"| 
|-
| 2003
| Absynthe
| Best World Music Album
| 
|-
| 2005
| Monsieur Camembert
| Best World Music Album
| 
|-
| 2007
| Famous Blue Cheese
| Best Original Soundtrack, Cast or Show Album
| 
| 
|-

References

External links
Official website

ARIA Award winners
Australian jazz ensembles
Monsieur Camembert